The Hoax is a 1972 American comedy film directed by Robert Anderson, and starring Bill Ewing, Frank Bonner, Jacques Aubuchon, Sharon DeBord, Don Dubbins, Harriet Gibson and Tom Benko. The film was released by All-Scope International on April 19, 1972.

Plot
Two scheming ne'er-do-wells find a lost nuclear weapon in the ocean near Los Angeles. They decide to light-heartedly try and blackmail the city by asking for money from each citizen. This arouses the attention of the local authorities.

Cast
Bill Ewing as Cy McCarten
Frank Bonner as Clete Dempsey
Jacques Aubuchon as Chief Belkins
Sharon DeBord as Gracie
Don Dubbins as Sergeant O'Roherty
Harriet Gibson as Mrs. Petrucci
Tom Benko as Engineer

References

External links

1972 comedy films
American comedy films
1972 films
1970s English-language films
1970s American films